Gwendolyn Lenna Torrence (born June 12, 1965) is a retired American sprinter and Olympic gold medalist. She was born in Decatur, Georgia. She attended Columbia High School and the University of Georgia. She was offered a scholarship because of her athletic abilities, but she said she wasn't interested because she initially wanted to become a beautician. From the persuasion from her coaches and family, she chose to enroll to the University of Georgia.

In the early 1990s, Gwen Torrence was one of the best sprinters in the world, winning five Olympic medals, and three gold.

Torrence won medals at the Summer Olympics, Outdoor & Indoor World Championships, Pan American Games, Goodwill Games, and World University Games.
 
In 1988, Torrence achieved a tie with Evelyn Ashford in the 55 m race at the U.S. national indoor championships. She also had many battles both on the track and in the press with Florence Griffith Joyner.

In the 200 m at the 1995 World Championships, she was disqualified for stepping out of her lane after finishing first. This left her idol, Merlene Ottey, to be promoted to first place.

In 2000 she was inducted into the Georgia Sports Hall of Fame.

International competitions

National titles
USA Outdoor Track and Field Championships
100 m: 1995
200 m: 1988, 1993, 1995
USA Indoor Track and Field Championships
55 m: 1989
60 m: 1994, 1995, 1996
200 m: 1994, 1996

Personal bests
Outdoor
100-meter dash – 10.82 (1994)
200-meter dash – 21.72 (1992)
400-meter dash – 49.64 (1992)

Indoor
50-meter dash – 6.07 (1996)
55-meter dash – 6.56 (1987)
60-meter dash – 7.02 (1996)

References

External links
 
 
 
 

1965 births
Living people
People from Decatur, Georgia
Track and field athletes from Atlanta
American female sprinters
African-American female track and field athletes
Olympic gold medalists for the United States in track and field
Olympic silver medalists for the United States in track and field
Olympic bronze medalists for the United States in track and field
Athletes (track and field) at the 1988 Summer Olympics
Athletes (track and field) at the 1992 Summer Olympics
Athletes (track and field) at the 1996 Summer Olympics
Pan American Games track and field athletes for the United States
Pan American Games medalists in athletics (track and field)
Pan American Games gold medalists for the United States
Athletes (track and field) at the 1987 Pan American Games
World Athletics Championships athletes for the United States
World Athletics Championships medalists
World Athletics Indoor Championships medalists
Georgia Lady Bulldogs track and field athletes
Medalists at the 1996 Summer Olympics
Medalists at the 1992 Summer Olympics
Universiade medalists in athletics (track and field)
Goodwill Games medalists in athletics
Universiade gold medalists for the United States
IAAF World Athlete of the Year
USA Outdoor Track and Field Championships winners
USA Indoor Track and Field Championships winners
World Athletics Championships winners
Medalists at the 1985 Summer Universiade
Medalists at the 1987 Summer Universiade
Competitors at the 1994 Goodwill Games
Medalists at the 1987 Pan American Games
Olympic female sprinters
21st-century African-American people
21st-century African-American women
20th-century African-American sportspeople
20th-century African-American women